Red market may refer to:

 Organ trade, the trading of human organs, tissues, or other body products
 The Red Market, a book by Scott Carney about economic transactions around the human body
 "Red Market" in counter-economics, meaning market of violence and theft not approved by the State
 Red Market (building), in Santo António, Macau, China

See also
 Qırmızı Bazar ('Red market'), a village in Azerbaijan